HRV may refer to:

Medicine
 Heart rate variability
 Holmes' ribgrass virus
 Human rhinovirus

Companies, groups and organizations
 Harness Racing Victoria, statutory body
 Holden Racing Team, motorsports team
 AirInter1	(ICAO airline code: HRV), see List of defunct airlines of Chad
 Sahara Aero Services (ICAO airline code: HRV), see List of defunct airlines of Chad

Other uses
 Heat recovery ventilation
 Croatia (ISO 3166-1 alpha-3 code: HRV)
 Croatian language (ISO 639-2 and ISO 639-3 codes hrv)
 Honda HR-V, a sport utility vehicle

See also